Schlesinger is a lunar impact crater on the far side of the Moon. The crater Esnault-Pelterie overlies the western part of the rim and the outer rampart of that crater has covered about half the interior floor, leaving a crescent-shaped feature. To the south-southwest of Schlesinger is the crater Von Zeipel and to the southeast lies Quetelet.

In addition to the overlapping Esnault-Pelterie, the rim of Schlesinger is overlain by the satellite crater Schlesinger M along the southern rim and a small crater along the northern rim. The remaining rim is heavily worn and the features have been rounded. Only about half the interior floor remains uncovered, and this is relatively level and marked only by a few small craterlets.

Satellite craters
By convention these features are identified on lunar maps by placing the letter on the side of the crater midpoint that is closest to Schlesinger.

References

 
 
 
 
 
 
 
 
 
 
 
 

Impact craters on the Moon